Linsdall Richardson  (24 December 18811 January 1967) was a 20th century British geologist and academic author who was awarded the Lyell Medal in 1937.

Life
Linsdall Richardson was born in Burnley in Lancashire on 24 December 1881. He was the son of Rev John Linsdall Richardson (b.1849), then a curate, and his wife, Fanny Sutcliffe of Burnley. The family moved to Holton, Suffolk in 1882 and to Cratfield in Norfolk in 1884.

He was educated at Clifton College, Bristol. He spent most of his life as Director of Cheltenham school of Science and Technology. In 1908 he was elected a Fellow of the Royal Society of Edinburgh. His proposers were Edward William Prevost, Alexander Morison McAldowie, John Walter Gregory and John Horne.

In the First World War he worked on conscription with the Ministry of National Service.

He died on New Years Day, 1 January 1967.

He donated a large number of borehole samples of Quaternary sands and gravels to the Cheltenham Museum.

Publications
[[File:Geological map Moreton-in-Marsh Richardson 1929.jpg|thumb|Geological map from The Country around Moreton-in-Marsh]] Wells and Springs of Warwickshire (1928) Full-text at the Internet ArchiveWells and Springs of Somerset (1928)The Country around Moreton-in-Marsh (1929) Full-text at the Internet ArchiveWells and Springs in Worcestershire (1930) Full-text at the Internet ArchiveWells and Springs of Gloucestershire (1930) Wells and Springs in Leicestershire (1931) Full-text at the Internet ArchiveThe Country around Cirencester (1933) Full-text at the Internet ArchiveWells and Springs of Herefordshire (1935)Geology of the Country around Witney'' (1946) Full-text at the Internet Archive

References

1881 births
1967 deaths
People from Clapham
20th-century British geologists
Fellows of the Royal Society of Edinburgh
Fellows of the Linnean Society of London
Lyell Medal winners
Fellows of the Geological Society of London